Tolia "Tony" Solaita (January 15, 1947 – February 10, 1990) was an American first baseman in Major League Baseball. He played for the New York Yankees, Kansas City Royals, California Angels, Toronto Blue Jays and Montreal Expos between 1968 and 1979. He also played four seasons in Japan for the Nippon-Ham Fighters from 1980 to 1983.

As of 2019, Solaita is still the only Major League Baseball player to have hailed from American Samoa. Mike Fetters, Benny Agbayani, Chris Aguila, Matt Tuiasosopo, Wes Littleton, and Sean Manaea are American-born major-leaguers of partial Samoan descent.

Solaita was a prolific home run hitter in the minor leagues, hitting 49 regular-season home runs in 1968 for High Point-Thomasville, but was mostly relegated to a backup or platoon position during his Major League playing days. He was selected by the Royals from the Charleston Charlies in the Rule 5 draft on December 3, 1973. In 1975, while playing for the Royals, he hit 16 home runs in 231 at-bats, second to only Dave Kingman in home run to at-bat ratio.

After becoming a free agent following the 1979 season, Solaita opted for a four-year contract in the Japanese League, where he was designated hitter for the Nippon-Ham Fighters and averaged nearly 40 home runs a year. Solaita retired after the 1983 season.

In 525 games over seven seasons, Solaita posted a .255 batting average (336-for-1316) with 164 runs, 50 home runs, 203 RBI and 214 bases on balls. Defensively, he recorded a .993 fielding percentage as a first baseman.

He was murdered in Tafuna, American Samoa on February 10, 1990. He was shot in a dispute over a land transaction.

References

External links

Tony Solaita at The Deadball Era

1947 births
1990 deaths
Expatriate baseball players in Canada
Expatriate baseball players in Japan
American Samoan murder victims
Binghamton Triplets players
California Angels players
Charleston Charlies players
Columbus White Sox players
Deaths by firearm in American Samoa
Fort Lauderdale Yankees players
Greensboro Yankees players
Gulf Coast Yankees players
High Point-Thomasville Hi-Toms players
Kansas City Royals players
Major League Baseball designated hitters
Major League Baseball first basemen
Major League Baseball players from American Samoa
Male murder victims
Montreal Expos players
New York Yankees players
Nippon Ham Fighters players
Nippon Professional Baseball designated hitters
People murdered in American Samoa
Syracuse Chiefs players
Toronto Blue Jays players
Tucson Toros players
West Haven Yankees players
People from Nu'uuli
Baseball players of insular areas of the United States
American Samoan sportsmen